Panushanth Kulenthiran (born 26 July 1990) is a Sri Lankan professional footballer who plays as a striker for Italian side Senna Gloria and the Tamil Eelam national team.

Career
Born in Jaffna, Kulenthiran began his career in the youth side for Palermo. In the 2008–09 season, he made 22 appearances on loan at Vibonese.

After two years with Palermo signed in summer 2009 for Swiss side AC Bellinzona. On 1 February 2010, A.S. Roma signed the Tamil forward on loan from Bellinzona.
He returned Switzerland for the 2011–12 season and, in summer 2012, he moved to Italian team A.S.D. Monreale Calcio, based in Monreale.

References

1990 births
Living people
Association football forwards
Sri Lankan footballers
Palermo F.C. players
U.S. Vibonese Calcio players
AC Bellinzona players
A.S. Roma players
Expatriate footballers in Italy
Expatriate footballers in Switzerland